The Ngoạn Mục Pass, also called the Sông Pha pass, after Sông Pha at the foot of the pass, is a scenic mountain pass in Vietnam between Ninh Thuận province and the Lang Biang plateau. It was known to the French as Bellevue Pass.

References

Mountain passes of Vietnam
Landforms of Ninh Thuận province
Landforms of Lâm Đồng province